Gotfried Becker (1681–1750) was a Danish pharmacist. He owned Elefant Apotek in Købmagergade in Copenhagen from 1708 and served as royal court pharmacist from 1712.

Early life and education
Becker was born in Copenhagen on 24 January 1681, the eldest son of pharmacist Johann Gottfried Becker and Sophie Iversdatter Bath. His two younger brothers and two younger sisters did not survive childhood. His father was the owner of Elefant Apotek in Købmagergade. Becker was taught the trade by his father and then continued his studied abroad in 1702-5.

Career
 
In 1708 Becker took over the pharmacy in Købmagergade after his father. He was appointed to field pharmacist (feltapoteker) in 1709 and accompanied the army to first Scania and later Pommeria. He was present with his field pharmacy  at the Battle of Gadebusch in 1712. Later that same year he was appointed to royal court pharmacist. His pharmacy in Købmagergade was completely destroyed in the Copenhagen Fire of 1728 but reopened in a new building in 1737. He  was also engaged in large-scale trade with other goods. He was appointed to Kammerassessors in 1749,

Personal life
 
6 May 1712, Becker married Cathrine Schupp f(10 Avgust 1693 - 30 June 1713), a daughter of merchant Christian Schupp, but she died in June next year just one week after giving birth to their first child, Johan Christian Becker (23 June 1713 – 3+ April 1755). Becker married second time Johanna Heinricca Nørck (28 October 1694 - 31 January 1765), a daughter of merchant Johan Heinrich Nørck, on1 4 October 1714. She bore him 16 children of which four girls and three boys survived to adulthood.

The family in a large house next to the pharmacy in Købmagergade. He died on 19 February 1750. His widow then operated the pharmacy until 1756 when it was passed on to their son Johan Gottfried Becker (17 July 1723 – 20 April 1790).

References

External links
 Gotfried Becker at geni.com

1681 births
1750 deaths
Danish pharmacists